Abhijit Kokate (born 1982) is an Indian film editor in Bollywood, most known for his films, Not a Love Story (2011), Department (2012) and most recent film, Queen (2014).

Abhijit Kokate  started his career as an editor in 2011 with director/producer Ram Gopal Varma and is currently working with director/producer Anurag Kashyap.

Abhijit Kokate has also written and directed a short film titled, The Vanishing Hitchhiker, for which he has won the Best Direction award at the Mahindra XUV 500 Memorable Stories short film contest, conducted by The 48 Hour Film Project.

Background
He was born in Nagpur, Maharashtra, India.

Filmography

References

External links
 

1982 births
Artists from Nagpur
Living people
Hindi film editors
Film editors from Maharashtra